Meadowbrook, West Virginia may refer to:
Meadowbrook, Harrison County, West Virginia, an unincorporated community in Harrison County
Meadowbrook, Kanawha County, West Virginia, an unincorporated community in Kanawha County